foodora is an online food delivery brand owned by Delivery Hero. It was founded in Munich, Germany and currently operates in Denmark, Sweden, Norway, and Finland.

The CEO of foodora is Hans Skruvfors.

History

foodora was founded under the name Volo GmbH in Munich in February 2014. It relocated to Berlin when Rocket Internet acquired 100% of the company in April 2015. In June 2015, it also acquired food delivery services Hurrier (in Canada), Suppertime (in Australia), and Heimschmecker (in Austria), which now all operate under the foodora brand. In September 2015, Delivery Hero acquired foodora from Rocket Internet. foodora was then merged with Delivery Hero's upscale food delivery brand, Urban Taste, under the name foodora.

In December 2018, the Dutch group Takeaway purchased the German delivery operations of Delivery Hero, including foodora Germany. On April 1, 2019, the transaction was completed, with foodora GmbH officially belonging to Lieferando, a part Takeaway. 

Delivery Hero continues to operate under the foodora brand in other markets. As of May 2020, foodora remains available in Finland, Norway and Sweden.

Operations
Using foodora's website or mobile app, customers can browse restaurants near them, place their order, and pay. The order is then prepared by the restaurant, picked up by one of foodora's couriers (foodsters), and delivered to the customer “in about 30 minutes". foodora provides both B2C and B2B food delivery services. In Germany, foodora suffers from high costs of about €12–14 per driver hour. In January 2017, it was reported that foodora made a loss of approximately €5–6 million per month globally, though the company is trying to reduce costs and improve efficiency. In Sweden, foodora is growing rapidly and has employed hundreds of riders. The Swedes' increased need for fast deliveries has accelerated. In March 2021, the company introduced the first autonomous delivery robot into its fleet in Stockholm. The droid, called Doora, will work in quick-commerce, delivering anything from household goods, groceries, pharmaceuticals, electronics, and more.

Geographical presence
foodora operates in four Nordic countries: Denmark, Finland, Norway and Sweden.

Former operations
Previously the company also operated in Australia, Austria, Canada, France, Germany, Italy, and the Netherlands.

Australia
foodora had expanded over the Australian market in Sydney, Melbourne and Brisbane. In September 2015, foodora acquired a local delivery company Suppertime, later re-branding it to foodora in May. On 1 August 2018, foodora announced that it was closing operations in Australia on 20 August 2018.

Canada

In July 2015, foodora entered the Canadian market by acquiring Toronto-based delivery company Hurrier. They expanded to Montreal in October 2015 and later re-branded both cities to foodora in January 2016. An expansion to Vancouver occurred in 2016. They expanded to Ottawa in early 2019. In the Summer of 2019, it deliverers in Toronto and Mississauga campaigned to unionize with the support of the Canadian Union of Postal Workers. foodora claimed that deliverers were independent contractors and therefore were not entitled to form a bargaining unit. The votes were sealed pending the resolution of legal disputes between the delivery workers and the corporation. foodora rolled out a partnership with the LCBO in September 2019 in Toronto. On 4 March 2020, the Ontario Labour Relations Board, in a landmark decision, ruled that it deliverers were dependent, rather than independent, contractors, and therefore could unionize. On 27 April 2020, the company announced that it was closing operations in Canada on 11 May 2020.

Netherlands
foodora ended its operations in the Netherlands on 15 October 2018. It had been active in the country, since May 2015.

Controversies

foodora has been accused of "sham contracts" with its workers. In October 2016, its workers in Turin responded to the proposed change from hourly work to piece work with an organised protest against the general reduction in quality of work. In 2017, its workers protested working conditions in Berlin.

foodora workers in Australia have spoken out about the company. Workers have protested against the continuously falling rate of pay and policies that encourage dangerous behavior on the road. Also of concern is workers' status as independent contractors despite their working conditions resembling that of employees. foodora has responded punitively against workers who have spoken out, leading at least two workers to pursue legal action against the company. On 16 November 2018, foodora lost its unfair dismissal case, as the court ruled that its drivers were classed as employees rather than contractors, and was ordered to pay a former delivery driver almost $16,000 in compensation.

References

External links

 

Online food ordering
Online retailers of Germany
Retail companies established in 2015
Transport companies established in 2015
Internet properties established in 2015
Food and drink companies based in Berlin
Logistics companies